The Société de transport de Lévis also known as STLevis (Lévis Transit Corporation) is a public transportation agency created in 1980, operating mainly in Lévis on the south shore of the Saint Lawrence River, being the counterpart of the Réseau de transport de la Capitale (RTC) on the north side. STLevis offers connections between Lévis and Quebec City; RTC buses currently do not have any services to the south shore.

Description
The corporation operates 71 40ft low-floor diesel vehicles, 12 40ft low-floor hybrid vehicles, 8 articulated buses,  4 midibuses, and employs 172 people. In 2016, it served more than 4.2 million riders.

The agency owns and operates a 7,500 m² bus depot in the Desjardins borough of the city. Built in 1986, the depot was renovated in the early 2010s to increase its bus storage capacity and the number of maintenance spots.

Routes
The STLevis offers an up-to-date list of routes.

Lévisien routes 

 Lévisien-1- Traverse-Lagueux
 Lévisien-2- Traverse-Université Laval
 Lévisien-3- Lagueux-Université Laval

Local routes, Desjardins / Chaudière-Est 
11 - Traverse > Hôtel-Dieu > UQAR > Lauzon > / Traverse > Lauzon > UQAR > Hôtel-Dieu > (new route, June 2014)
12 - Vieux-Lévis - Lauzon (new route, August 2014)
13 - Dorval > Hôtel-Dieu > UQAR > St-David > / Dorval > St-David > UQAR > Hôtel-Dieu > (new route, June 2014)
14 - Traverse - Innoparc
15- Traverse - Pintendre
19 - Breakeyville - de la Concorde Station
27R- Saint-Romuald - Saint-Jean-Chrysostome
35R- Charny - de la Concorde Station

Local routes, Chaudière-Ouest 
22 - Saint-Nicolas South - Des Rivières Park & Ride
23 - Saint-Nicolas North - Des Rivières Park & Ride
24 - Saint-Rédempteur - Des Rivières Park & Ride

Express services (weekdays only)
 ELQ / ESQ / ECQ - Express Lévis / Saint-Jean-Chrysostome / Charny - Downtown Quebec 
 EOQ - Express Des Rivières Park & Ride - Downtown Quebec
 27E / 34E / 35E - Saint-Jean-Chrysostome / Saint-Romuald / Charny - Université Laval
 31E / 41E - Express Saint-Jean-Chrysostome / Charny - Cégep de Lévis-Lauzon
 33E - Express Lévis-centre - Cégep Garneau
 43E - Express Des Rivières Park & Ride - Cégep Garneau
 60E - Express Des Rivières Park & Ride - Marly (Quebec City)
 65 - Saint-Lambert - Des Rivières Park & Ride

References

External links

 STL official web site

Levis
Levis
Transport in Lévis, Quebec
Transport in Quebec City